Teligi  is a village in the southern state of Karnataka, India. It is located in the Harapanahalli taluk of Vijayanagara District.

Demographics
 India census, Teligi had a population of 6080 with 3054 males and 3026 females.

See also
 Davanagere
 Districts of Karnataka

References

External links
 http://Davanagere.nic.in/

Villages in Davanagere district